Qalateh Rashkeh (also Romanized as Qalāteh Rashkeh and Qalāteh-ye Rashkeh; also known as Doroshkeh, Kala Darashga, Kalāteh Rashkeh, Kalāt-e Tarashkeh, and Qal‘at Tarashka) is a village in Hoseynabad-e Shomali Rural District, Saral District, Divandarreh County, Kurdistan Province, Iran. At the 2006 census, its population was 80, in 14 families. The village is populated by Kurds.

References 

Towns and villages in Divandarreh County
Kurdish settlements in Kurdistan Province